Lluís Elcacho Roda (born 6 January 1964 in Lleida, Catalonia) is a Spanish former footballer who played as a defensive midfielder, and is a manager.

External links

1964 births
Living people
Sportspeople from Lleida
Spanish footballers
Footballers from Catalonia
Association football midfielders
La Liga players
Segunda División players
Segunda División B players
UE Lleida players
Real Oviedo players
CF Balaguer footballers
Spanish football managers
Segunda División B managers
Tercera División managers
Atlético Monzón managers